Siolim is a village in Bardez taluka, and a census town on the central west coast of India, in the North Goa district of Goa. The 2001 population was 10,311, and 10,936 in 2011. Siolim is also the name of a constituency in the Goa assembly, which includes Assagao, Anjuna and Oxel, in addition to Siolim. A person from Siolim is known as a Siolcar or even as Shivalkar.

Location

Siolim is situated about 7 km (4.3 mi) from Mapusa. It is located around the Chapora River. There is a bridge over River Chapora, in place of the prior ferry.

To Siolim's north lies the quiet village of Oxel; green hillocks hedge it towards Assagao in the south and the east. Camurlim to lies to its east, and in the west flows the Chapora river with Morjim and its pine-wooded beach on the northern bank in Pernem.

Subdivisions 
Siolim has several different types of subdivisions, which are independent of one another. They include:

Vadde 
There are nine vadde (or village wards, subdivisions -- vaddo is singular and vadde is plural). These are: Igrez-Vaddo, Gaunsa-Vaddo, Bamon-Vaddo, Marna, Dcruz-Vaddo, Costa Vaddo. Porta-Vaddo, Tarchi Bhatt, Guddem, Aframent, Vaddi and Oxel in Siolim-Marna panchayat. Besides this, there are seven vadde in Siolim-Sodiem panchayat.

Panchayats 
There are three panchayats, which govern diverse areas of the village: Siolim-Marna, Siolim-Sodiem, and Siolim-Oxel.

Comunidades 
There are two comunidades, which are ancient self-governing and village-agriculture promotion bodies: Siolim and Marna.

Parishes 
There are three parishes in the area: Siolim, Oxel and Tropa.

Etymology
The name "Siolim" is believed to have come from two words --  'Xinv'  and  'Halli' . "Xinv" (pronounced 'Shiu') means "lion" and "Halli" refers to a village or place. This probably means that there once were lions in the hills of Siolim. This origin of the name has been documented in Fr. Moreno de Souza's book. An argument in favour of this origin is that the village on the other side of the Siolim (not Marna) hill is called Vagali, which could also come from the words  'Vag'  +  'Halli'  ("Vag" meaning "tiger" in the local Konkani language). Another explanation is that the name comes from  'Shivalaya' , which means a temple of Shiva, but there is no documented evidence for this origin

Churches

Church of Mae de Deus (1568-1600) 
Franciscan missionaries first built a church - the Church of Mae de Deus - at the Sonarkhett hill, wedged between Siolim and Assagao. It was located centrally to serve the spiritual needs of the people in the villages of Anjuna, Assagao, Siolim and Oxel. But being situated on the rising hill and probably being a makeshift kutcha structure, it did not survive many years, leaving behind the black stone cross at Sonarkhett.

This first church in Siolim was built near the site of the Mae de Deus chapel in Gaunsa-Vaddo in 1568. There is a plaque commemorating this fact in the chapel compound. This church was probably a kutcha (temporary) structure, and it survived for merely 32 years.

The Gaunsa-Vaddo Chapel of Mae de Deus was constructed in 1847.

St. Anthony's Church (1630-1901) (1902-today)

Miracle 
Siolim's church is dedicated to St. Anthony of Padua. The church possesses two steeples on the frontispiece and a statue of St Anthony holding a serpent on a leash. This depicts an incident that occurred during the construction of the church when a snake is believed to have been disrupting construction work. The people are said to have interceded with St. Anthony for help, and placed his statue at the construction site. The next morning, the snake was found caught in the cord placed in the statue's hand. In the church, the statues, paintings, and even the church bell, depict St. Anthony holding a serpent tied with a cord to commemorate this miracle.

The First Church: In 1600, the missionaries planned for a new and larger church in another location more central to the Christians of Siolim. But this project is said to have been caught in doubts due to lack of funds. At that time, two Portuguese merchants were caught in a severe storm while sailing from Portugal. They had with them a statue of St. Anthony and vowed that if they made it to port safely, they would build a church where they landed.

Their ship is said to have entered the Chapora River and docked on the left bank near the village of Marna. It was here they met the Franciscan missionaries looking out for funds. The new church was dedicated to St. Anthony, instead of Mae de Deus (the Mother of God), and completed in 1630.

The Second Church: In the early part of the 20th century, the ravages of time took their toll on the first church of Saint Anthony. Attempts to repair the wall and renovate the roof appeared futile. The whole structure was in danger of collapsing. The parishioners decided to build a new church on the same site. The foundation stone of the church was laid in November 1902. Its consecration took place on 28 December 1907.

Our Lady of Consolation of the persecuted 
Earlier, the local Christians would attend religious services at the Military chapel at Tropa, which was raised to a Church in 1971. During Portuguese rule, this place was well-fortified by the Portuguese with police to ward off the Bhosle attacks. The word tropa which means 'military troops', still survives in the name given to Tropa parish. Its church is dedicated to Our Lady of Consolation of the Persecuted.

Our Lady Of The Sea Church 
The church at Oxel-Siolim dedicated to Our Lady Of The Sea.

Chapels

 Mae de Deus Chapel: Located in Gaunsa-Vaddo, Siolim, opposite Holy Cross Convent. It is built near the site of the ruined Mae de Deus church. Constructed in 1847, the chapel feast takes place on the first Sunday of May.
 St. Sebastian Chapel: at Marna.
 Nossa Senhora de Piedade Chapel: in Vaddy.
 Vailankani Chapel: in Bamon-Vaddo.
 St. Joao Chapel: in Fernandes-Vaddo / Bamon-Vaddo.
 Fernandes-Vaddo Chapel: located in Fernandes-Vaddo.
 Gudddem Chapel

* Our Lady of Sorrows (Nossa Senhora das An-gustias) Chapel: Located in Porta -Vaddo, Siolim, on the bend of the road leading to the Siolim-Chopdem-Morjim bridge. The chapel feast is on the Second Sunday of May.

 Holy Cross Chapel: located in Tarchi Bhatt.
 Martyrs Chapel (Matti kopel): Located uphill on Modlem Bhat, Feast celebrated on 29 December, way of the cross in Lent.

Temples

 Shri Datta Mandir: Developed and designed by architect Nandan Sawant. Dedicated to Shri Dattatreya, the trinity, known for its serenity austere rites. The deity worshipped is Ekhmukhi which is considered sacred and rare. Located at Ghol Marna Siolim, away from traffic and human settlements. A huge mandam has been built in front of the temple. Festivals there include Gurupadwa, Vardhapan Divas (foundation day), Gurudwadshi, and Dattajayanti, among others. This temple was established by Kai. Gopinath Dattaram Prabhu (Porob) (1900–49), a Marathi immigrant born poor and religious from a young age. His father died when he was 20. He went to Narsobaa-Vaddi to perform the required rites. Influenced by Lord Dattatreya, he loved visiting Narsoba-Vaddi. He later resided there and occupied himself in worshipping Lord Dattatreya. At 31, he established a portrait of Lord Dattatreya at Mapusa. He then established a temple. After a few months, he came to be Kai Atmaram Fulari's resident. There, he would bathe near the spring at Ghol Marna. It was set amidst nature, thick forest, tall coconut trees, medicinal water emerging from springs, and hills on all sides. In 1942 he sought the owner's, Visnum Ranga Kamat Dalal, permission and built a small hut where he started worshipping a portrait of Lord Dattatreya. Devotees started visiting this place. Festivals like Gurudwadashi, Dattajayanti, and Gurupadwa were celebrated. He got known as Baba Maharaj. After his death, his samadhi was constructed in front of the temple. Shreepad Fulari continued the worship.

* Sateri Temple: Designed by Goan architect Ralino de Souza after 1961, this temple is situated in Shelim, Siolim. Dedicated to goddess Sateri, it is known for the festival of Diwsans, when the temple is surrounded by a long feri. Many women go round the temple in a procession with oil lamps in their hand and on their head.

Government and politics
Siolim is part of Siolim (Goa Assembly constituency) and North Goa (Lok Sabha constituency).

Schools
There are five schools in Siolim, linked together in a community known as "Siolim Super School Complex". Every year, the Super School Complex organises a common exam for students of Std X (tenth) in October. The Super School Complex also organises competitions for students of these five schools. These schools are:

 Holy Cross High School: Popular convent, founded by the Congregation of the Daughters of the Cross in 1933. Since 1975, it has been run as a co-ed school, with boarding facilities only for girls.
 St Francis Xavier's High School and Higher Secondary School was established in Corlim, Mapusa, in 1937 by Miguel Antonio D'Souza, and transferred to Bamon-Vaddo, Siolim, in 1950. Since 1953 it has been run by the Missionaries of St. Francis de Sales.

 Shri Shanta Vidyalaya: Situated in Sodiem, and founded on 9 July 1973. It is managed by Vidya Bharati. Mrs. Prajeeta Sangale is the current Headmistress.
 Shri Vasant Vidyalaya: Situated at Porta-Vaddo.
 Keerti Vidyalaya: Situated at Portawaddo, set up in 1969 and managed by Swami Vivekanand Seva Sangh, Siolim.

People of Siolim

Siolim has produced doctors, musicians, sports-persons, bishops, priests, and other representatives in other professions:

Doctors 
Siolim has over a dozen doctors. At one time, everyone rushed to "Gauddo dotor" and (Late) Dr Zeferino de Souza. Patients from the surrounding villages were known to throng the consulting room of Dr. Datta Ramnath Naik. Dr. Frank Pereira, Dr. Vinaik Chodankar, Dr. Bidhan C Das, Dr. Edna Pereira, Dr. Ramchandra Naik Bandorkar, Dr. Thaly, Dr. Ragunath L. Naik,  Dr. Donald D’Souza, Dr. Sachin Yeshwant Govekar, Dr. Jawaharlal Henrique, Dr. Belarmino Ribeiro, Dr. Geeta S Govekar, Dr. Anil Humraskar, Dr. Lalita Fernandes, Dr. Noel Henrique, Dr. Minaxi S Gawas, Dr. Hortencia Sophia Pereira, Dr. Aditi S Parulekar, Dr. Diksha C Vaingankar have been among Siolim’s recent physicians.

Clergy 
Native clergy include Bishop Leonard Monteiro, former Archbishop of Nagpur. Former Bishop of Belgaum, the Rt. Rev. Ignatius Lobo is from Gaunsa-Vaddo. The present Bishop of Sindhudurg diocese, Rev. Allwyn Baretto is from Fernandes Vaddo, Siolim. Fr. Moreno D’Souza, SJ, the popular Jesuit who edited the Konkani monthly Roti too hailed from Siolim. Other prominent clergymen include Mgr Aires Fernandes, Fr. Walter Mathias, Fr Antonio Paulo Cyriaco, Fr. Cyriaco Fernandes, Fr. Damien Fernandes (MSFS), Fr. Matthew Fernandes, Fr. Francis Fernandes, Fr. Anthony Fernandes (MSFS),Fr. Reggie D’Souza (MSFS) Fr. Bruno Rodrigues (MSFS), Fr. Archie Fernandes (MSFS), Fr. Vivian Lobo s.j. (former Principal of St Britto High School at Mapusa), Fr. Ross, Frs. Francis & Xavier Pinto (C.Ss.R.), and lately, Fr. Valerian Carvalho (MSFS), Fr. Marcos (MSFS),Fr. Rawson (MSFS) among others.

Sportspersons 
Among sports-persons, hockey internationals Gregory, Olimpio, Edgar and Egbert Fernandes and international hockey referee Domnick J Fernandes have represented India. Marie (Simoes) Mendonca captained the Indian hockey team, represented India at the first and Second Asian Games in Delhi and Manila respectively in athletics and in 1956 wore Indian colours at the Melbourne Olympics. At the national level, Eleuterio "Electro" Fernandes of Vaddy played for Air India/Indian Airlines in the mid-1960s, Peter Fernandes (Vasco Sports Club), Johnny Franco and goalkeeper Caetano Fernandes (both of Dempo), earned honours for Siolim. Footballer Maxie (Burmah Shell) hailed from Bamon-Vaddo, Siolim.

Musicians 
Siolim has been home to some prominent musicians. Relatives of Pinta Xapai, who died at 114, in 1892, erected a statue of Beethoven in his courtyard in Gaunsa-Vaddo. Inscriptions identify the Brazil-born descendant who funded the project, as also the descendant who performed the inauguration.

 Prominent Indian pop musician Remo Fernandes hails from Siolim's Fernandes -Vaddo -(Guddem).
 Another well-known musician was late Joaozinho Carvalho "Johnson". Johnson of the prominent Goan dance band Johnson & Jolly Boys was also a footballer in his younger days. Late Johnson's son, Juvencio Carvalho has carried on the tradition, by training budding musicians.
 Late Rosario Tequila Basil was a saxophonist, who played for diners at class hotels in Bombay and the Hindi film ensembles.
 Writer-trumpeter late Reginald Fernandes played for Hal Green, Nelly Batliwalla and her orchestra. Known as the "Romansincho Patxai" (Emperor of Konkani novels), he also wrote a record number of Konkani novels, nearly 100. A musician of high repute, he has left behind several Konkani compositions, which are played still on All India Radio, one of the well-known ones being the melancholic Adeus Korchea Vellar (The Time of Saying Goodbye) sung by Allan Costa.
 Late Antoninho de Souza was a music director and music recordist for the Portuguese-time Goan radio station Emissora de Goa & All India Radio, Panjim. The music and lyrics for the beautiful Konkani duet, Rajan and Prema were written by him.
 Well known satirist of yesteryear Cruz Noronha, popularly known as Cruz Jazzwala, was also from Siolim.
 Late Rev. Fr. Archiebald Archie Fernandes (MSFS) founder of Bands Greensleeves, well known in Bardez in the 1970s and also the founder of The Cascades, a band that still exists to this day. Fr. Archie was an ace Saxophonist, He played the tenor sax, alto sax, as well as clarinet with ease. Besides his attainments in Music, Fr. Archie was the Principal and Headmaster of St. Francis Xavier's High School, Siolim, from 1972-1979. He also served as the Principal and Headmaster of St. Thomas Boys High School, [[Aldona from 1979–80 and 1982-87. He was instrumental in starting the Mothergoose Nursery at Shaanwadi, Nagar Road, Pune, which now has grown into the full-fledged St. Francis de Sales High School.
 Pascoal Fernandes is one of India's jazz legends. He moved to his home village of Siolim, Goa, after doing the jazz/nightclub circuit in Mumbai for over two decades. He later sang and played almost every night at some of the best venues for live music in Goa.
 Fr. Valerian Carvalho (MSFS), presently at St. Francis Xavier's High School, also trains budding musicians besides playing his Violin.

 Other prominent individuals of Siolim 
 Late Rt. Rev. Ignatius Lobo's famed brother, John Lobo, was from the first batch of Indian Police Service in 1948, and ended his career as the Director, Central Bureau of Intelligence.
 Well-known cartoonist Alex Raphael Fernandes "Alexyz" and renowned fashion designer Savio Jon Fernandes are from Siolim.
 One of Goa's most prominent tiatrist, Kid Boxer hailed from Siolim. Well-known Konkani stage actors Romaldo Desouza Miss Cuticura and Vintorinho Rodriguez Victor Chevalier also hailed from Siolim (Bamon-Vaddo) as did late Mini Diogo.
 Domnic Fernandes from Bamon-Vaddo, was a librarian at St Xavier’s College, Bombay, between 1961 and 1997, and has been considered a walking encyclopaedia. Dominic was the first professional librarian of that prominent college and is credited with building up the library collection, having merged Departmental Libraries to create the Centralised Science Library, starting a photocopying facility in 1977-78 and promoting an open access system in the library when few college libraries did. Domnic "started the famous Canteen,  lectured on public speaking, edited the college magazine and Bibliodelic for many years. Xavier’s Development Programme or XDP was created and nurtured by him. His collection of paintings adorns walls in every corridor of St. Xavier’s College today... he was the President of BUCLA (Bombay University College Librarians Association ) for a number of years."
 Late Chevalier Bruno Fernandes, MBE & Knight of St Silvester, lived in Marna Siolim. Architect Ralino J de Souza is another prominent person, as was Herman Raymond (1907-1978), a former judge in Karachi.
 The late Monty D'Souza, who is the younger brother of Fr. Reggie D’Souza MSFS, (SFX High School) was well respected in Siolim for his social service. He was an active member of  Pão de S. Anton, the Siolim Foot Ball Club, Siolim Panchayat and the Lions Club. He was also a prominent Master of Ceremonies.

Historical firsts in the village
Electric power was introduced in 1972 and tap water flowed in 1975. By 1980 Siolim had a telephone exchange, which has since shifted to a large building. The first KTC bus travelled to Siolim on 14 July 1981. Broadband internet access was first available in January 2008.

Three brothers from Gaunsa-Vaddo - Santa, Ganexa and Zagre Gauns - are believed to have been the first Christian converts. Their descendants are Fr. Cyriaco Fernandes MSFS, Victor Santana, Dr. Cosmas and Fr. Damian Fernandes. Incidentally, there is a book written by Rev. Fr. Cyriaco Fernandes which gives a lot of information about Siolim, and Fr. Cyriaco's life in Brazil; the book is titled "Indian Apostle in Brazil" written by Rev. Fr. Damian Fernandes.An Indian Apostle in Brazil by Fr. Damian Fernandes is a detailed life account of Fr. Antonio Paulo Cyriaco Fernandes by his nephew, drawn out from letters to relatives in India. It was published by the Goa Jesuit Mission at the Nagpur press in 1952. This book contains information about Fr Fernandes' life in Brazil and also information about Siolim.

Concerns
Most of Siolim's green fields and hills are being destroyed due to mass immigration from other states of India, with an enormous rise in new constructions of housing for immigrants. Open spaces for children and youth to play outdoors are fast disappearing. Villagers have also voiced concern over unplanned development in the area, and the need to protect green areas.

Miscellaneous
 Siolim has had a few football teams, the most prominent being Football Club of Siolim (FC Siolim).
 Siolim has inspired the Goan mando "Siole dongra sokolu" (the title of which could translate to Beneath The Hills of Siolim)

Demographics
 India census, Siolim had a population of 10,311. Males constitute 48% of the population and females 52%. Siolim has an average literacy rate of 82%, higher than the national average of 59.5%: male literacy is 87%, and female literacy is 77%. In Siolim, 9% of the population is under 6 years of age.

References

Further reading
 Parish and Village of Siolim, by Sebastian D'Cruz
 The History of the Siolim Church'', by Sebastian D'Cruz

External links
 Website of St. Anthony's Church, Siolim
 Information about Siolim with pictures

Villages in North Goa district